Hit n Run Tour may refer to:

Hit 'n Run Tour (2007), by Kiss
Hit n Run Tour (2000), solo tour by Prince
Hit and Run Tour (2014), tour by Prince and 3rdeyegirl

See also
Hit and run (disambiguation)